Phalacra rufa is a moth in the family Drepanidae. It was described by George Hampson in 1910. It is found in Sri Lanka.

References

Moths described in 1910
Drepaninae
Moths of Sri Lanka